Doctor Zero may refer to:

Doctor Zero, a character in the comic book imprint Shadowline by Epic Comics
Doctor Zero, a character in the manga series Space Pirate Captain Harlock